Focus assessed transthoracic echocardiography (or FATE) is a type of transthoracic echocardiogram, or sonogram of the heart, often performed by non-cardiologist. The protocol has been used since 1989 and has four projections; subcostal four-chamber, apical four-chamber, parasternal long axis and parasternal short axis.

The original focused cardiac ultrasound protocol for non-cardiologists was devised by Dr Erik Sloth in 1989 and has formed the basis of hands-on FATE courses ever since.

The success of the original protocol has inspired a surge of replicas in many shapes and the coining of many imaginative acronyms: FEER, FEEL, Focus, Bleep, HART, FUSE etc. These are all variations of the original theme [1].

Gallery

See also
 Echocardiography

References
 "fate protocol" or "focus assessed transthoracic echocardiography" - Search Results - PubMed

External links 
 Official FATE protocol website with downloadable FATE card

Medical imaging